"Keep Ya Head Up" is a song by American rapper 2Pac from his second studio album, Strictly 4 My N.I.G.G.A.Z...(1993). It was released on October 28, 1993 as the album's third single. The song features R&B singer Dave Hollister and is dedicated to his godson Elijah, Corin Wray (Daughter of Salt) from Salt-N-Pepa and Latasha Harlins. Tupac emphasizes the abuse black women face in the society. 30 years later, the song has resurfaced on numerous platforms such as Instagram and TikTok to promote its lyrics. He states how women are creators and do so much for the community so he asks why men disrespect them.

Production and release
The beat is sampled from Zapp's "Be Alright" and the chorus is taken from The Five Stairsteps' "O-o-h Child". It was first released in Shakur's 1993 album Strictly 4 My N.I.G.G.A.Z. later appearing after his death in 1998 in his Greatest Hits compilation. A "sequel" to the song, "Baby Don't Cry (Keep Ya Head Up II)" was released on 2Pac's posthumous album Still I Rise in 1999. The song was featured in the Tupac biopic All Eyez on Me.

Music video
The video opens up with the words "Dedicated to the memory of Latasha Harlins, it's still on", in reference to the 1992 L.A. Riots. The video has a basic format with Shakur rapping in the middle of a circle surrounded by a crowd of people and in some scenes he is seen holding a young child. His mother Afeni Shakur and close friend Jada Pinkett Smith made cameo appearances in the video.

Critical reception

Alyssa Rosenberg of Brisbane Times felt the song "weaved together a critique of negligent fathers, an argument for abortion rights and a sharp analysis of misogyny."

Track listing
CDS – maxi single
 "Keep Ya Head Up" (LP version)
 "Keep Ya Head Up" (Vibe Tribe remix)
 "Keep Ya Head Up" (Madukey remix)
 "Rebel of the Underground"
 "I Wonda If Heaven's Got a Ghetto"

Charts

Weekly charts

Year-end charts

Certifications

Credits
Engineer – Bob Tucker (tracks: A2, B2), Norman "Slam" Whitfield, Jr.* (tracks: A2, B2)
Engineer [Remix] – Eric Flickinger (tracks: B1), Franklin Purrell (tracks: B1)
Mixed By – D. Nettlesbey* (tracks: A2), Norman "Slam" Whitfield, Jr.* (tracks: A2)
Producer – D-Flow Production Squad, The* (tracks: B2), D.J. Daryl* (tracks: A1, B1)
Remix [Additional] – Norman "Slam" Whitfield, Jr.* (tracks: B2)
Remix,
Producer [Additional Production] – Bryant "Moe Doe" Johnson* (tracks: B1), Battlecat* (tracks: B2), Howard Johnson (2) (tracks: B2), Kris Kellow* (tracks: B2), Lea Reis (tracks: B1), Paul Arnold (tracks: B2), Vibe Tribe (10) (tracks: A2)
Vocals – Black Angel, The (tracks: A1, B1), Money B (2) (tracks: B2), Shockalock (tracks: B2)

References

External links
 "Keep Ya Head Up" music video

1992 songs
1993 singles
Tupac Shakur songs
Interscope Records singles
Jive Records singles
Songs with feminist themes
Protest songs
Songs written by Tupac Shakur
American contemporary R&B songs
Music videos directed by David Dobkin